Coupland Independent School District is a public school district based in the community of Coupland, Texas (USA).

Located in Williamson County, a very small portion of the district extends into Travis County.

Coupland ISD has one school, Coupland Elementary, that serves students in grades kindergarten through eight. Students in grades nine through twelve attend Taylor High School in the Taylor Independent School District.

In 2009, the school district was rated "recognized" by the Texas Education Agency.

References

External links
 
Coupland, Texas – Coupland Civic Organization.

School districts in Williamson County, Texas
School districts in Travis County, Texas